Since the inception of the National Women's Soccer League in 2013, 24 players have scored three goals (a hat-trick) in a single match.

 The first player to score a hat-trick was Sydney Leroux, with the Boston Breakers against the Chicago Red Stars on May 4, 2013.
 The youngest player to score a hat-trick was Ebony Salmon (21 years, 170 days), with the Houston Dash against the Chicago Red Stars on July 16, 2022.
 One player, Sam Kerr, scored more than one hat-trick in a single season (two, 2017).
 Two players — Kerr (Sky Blue, Chicago) and Nadia Nadim (Sky Blue, Portland) — have scored hat-tricks for more than one NWSL team.
 Three players — Kerr, Kristen Hamilton, and Alex Morgan — have scored four goals in an NWSL match.
 Of the 12 active NWSL teams,
 four have not scored a hat-trick: Angel City FC (joined in 2022), Kansas City Current (2021), Orlando Pride (2016), and Racing Louisville FC (2021).
 five have not conceded a hat-trick: Angel City, Kansas City, North Carolina Courage (2017), Louisville, and San Diego Wave FC (2022).
 Sky Blue/Gotham FC have conceded the most hat-tricks (5), and the Courage have scored the most (5).

Hat-tricks

League matches

Note: The results column shows the home team score first. Numbers after players' names signify how many goals the player scored.

Other competitions

Multiple hat-tricks 
Six players have scored more than one hat-trick in NWSL competitions.

See also
 NWSL records and statistics

References

External links
 NWSL statistics
 NWSL on Soccerway
 NWSL on FBRef

NWSL
Hat-tricks